The German Commission E is a scientific advisory board of the Federal Institute for Drugs and Medical Devices formed in 1978. The commission gives scientific expertise for the approval of substances and products previously used in traditional, folk and herbal medicine.

The commission became known beyond Germany in the 1990s for compiling and publishing 380 monographs evaluating the safety and efficacy of herbs for licensed medical prescribing in Germany. The monographs were published between 1984 and 1994 in the Bundesanzeiger; they have not been updated since then but are still considered valid. A summary of the publications is available on the website of the commission; unofficial copies of the monographs are available at the Heilpflanzen-Welt Bibliothek. 
The monographs are a collection of official documents compiled over nearly two decades by a committee composed of twenty four scientific experts that was set up in 1978 to evaluate the safety and efficacy of herbal medicines by reviewing the extant literature.

There is an English translation by the American Botanical Council.

Criticism concerning the American version of the monographs
The Commission E monographs were imported into the United States with considerable fanfare in 1998 by The American Botanical Council. They were unequivocally endorsed in a foreword by Varro Eugene Tyler, a professor of pharmacognosy at Purdue University. Tyler states in his foreword that "...safety data were reviewed by the Commissioners according to a "doctrine of absolute proof" and efficacy according to a "doctrine of reasonable certainty." 

The 1998 book mentioned 10 but omitted 11 possible fatal reactions to the medicines described.

"All [of the monographs] lack literature references. . .."

One critic of Commission E is Jonathan Treasure, a UK-licensed medical herbalist and author of numerous herbalism monographs.

Treasure's lengthy review (31 K) claims that "The failure to include verifiable scientific primary sources necessarily places the entire Commission E Monograph corpus irredeemably outside the most elementary accepted standards of academic requirements for rigorous scientific publications."

References

External links
 English list of monographs
 German list of monographs
 Google Books version of the monographs in English

Biologically-based therapies
Medical manuals
Legal history of Germany
Alternative medicine publications